Chester Bennett (1892 - 1943) was an American silent film director. He was executed by the Japanese during the Occupation of Hong Kong in 1943.

Filmography
 When a Man Loves (1919)
 Captain Swift (1920)
 The Purple Cipher (1920)
 A Master Stroke (1920)
 The Romance Promoters (1920)
 Three Sevens (1921)
 The Secret of the Hills (1921)
 Diamonds Adrift (1921)
 Belle of Alaska (1922)
 Colleen of the Pines (1922)
 The Snowshoe Trail (1922)
 Thelma (1922)
 Divorce (1923)
 The Lullaby (1924)
 The Painted Lady (1924)
 Champion of Lost Causes (1925)
The Ancient Mariner (1925)
 Honesty – The Best Policy (1926)

References

External links

Chester Bennett at BFI

1892 births
1943 deaths
Film directors from San Francisco